Codazziceras is an early Late Cretaceous ammonite from the Late Cretaceous of Colombia, distinguished from Lyelliceras (Lyelliceratidae) from which it is based and added to the Euomphaloceratinae (Acanthoceratidae). The type species is Codazziceras scheibei and another described species is C. ospinae. Fossils of Codazziceras have been found in the La Frontera Formation of Huila, Cundinamarca and Boyacá, and in the Loma Gorda Formation of Aipe, Huila.

Etymology
The genus is named after Italian-Colombian geographer Agustín Codazzi.

Description
The shell is rather evolute, ornamented with ribs and clavate tubercles. Ribs are fairly strong on the flanks but weaken as they cross the venter. Whorl section is compressed, moderately embracing, flanks convex, venter moderately flattened with three rows of tubercles that tend to be elongate in the direction of coiling.

References

Bibliography

Further reading
 F. Etayo Serna, 1979. Zonation of the Cretaceous of central Colombia by ammonites. Publicaciones Geologicas Especiales del Ingeominas 2:1-188

Ammonitida genera
Acanthoceratidae
Cretaceous ammonites
Ammonites of South America
Cretaceous Colombia
Altiplano Cundiboyacense
Fossil taxa described in 1979